Pacific Medical College & Hospital is a private medical college in Udaipur, Rajasthan, India.

Academics 
The admission to the M.B.B.S. course is highly competitive. Students who have graduated from high school with Physics, Chemistry and Biology as core subjects can appear for in the UG admission test. The medical college offers 150 seats in M.B.B.S. course. 15% of total M.B.B.S. seats are for NRI candidates. Remaining seats are filled through NEET

See also 
 List of medical colleges in India
 List of medical colleges in Rajasthan
 Colleges and institutes in India

References

Medical colleges in Udaipur
Medical colleges in Rajasthan
Private medical colleges in India